The Codex Grandior ("Larger Codex") was a large single-volume copy of the Bible in an Old Latin translation that was made for or by Cassiodorus.  It was one of a number of works held at his monastic foundation Vivarium, near Squillace, Italy.

This codex was probably acquired in Italy by Benedict Biscop or Ceolfrid in 678 for the library of the new monastery at Monkwearmouth–Jarrow Abbey in Northumbria. The book no longer exists, but it is believed to have been used to create the Codex Amiatinus, the earliest surviving manuscript of the complete Latin Vulgate.

References

External links 
 John Chapman, The Codex Amiatinus and the Codex grandior in: Notes on the early history of the Vulgate Gospels, Clarendon Press, Oxford 1908, pp. 2–8.

Grandior
6th-century biblical manuscripts